This is a list of current and former television programs broadcast by TV Japan in North America.

The network broadcasts a variety of Japanese programs, ranging from anime to drama.

Current programming

News
 NHK News 7
 News Check 11
 News in Depth
 News Watch 9
 National capsule forecasts in Japanese from AccuWeather
 Weekend Japanology

Drama
 99.9
 A Fading Summer
 Aibō: Tokyo Detective Duo (Partners)
 Contrail: Crime and Love
 Good Partner
 It's not that I can't marry. I don't marry
 Jūhan Shuttai!
Kamen Rider Ghost
 The Last Restaurant
 The Most Difficult Romance
 Nezumi-Kozo Running Around Edo 2
 Sanadamaru
 Toto Nee-chan: Fatherly Sister
 Totto Television
 Whispers from a Crime Scene

Music
 AKB48 Show!
 Banana Zero Music
 The Covers
 J-Melo
 Music Station
 Okaasan to Issho
 NHK Nodo Jiman
 Shounen Club (Pop Music Club)
 School of Songs!
 Song Concert
 Songs of Japanese Spirit

Anime
 Anpanman
 Case Closed
 Chibi Maruko-chan
 One Piece
 Tsukumogami Kashimasu
 Waka Okami wa Shōgakusei!
 Ninja Hattori-kun Returns

Kids
 Kamen Rider Drive
 Chatty Jay's Sundry Shop
 Design Ah!
 Fun with English
 Fun with Japanese
 Home Cooking DJ
 Kid’s Discovery
 Wan Wan Wonderland

Former programming

Anime
 Aikatsu!
 Aikatsu Stars!
 Aikatsu Friends!
 Aikatsu on Parade!
 Anne of Green Gables (anime)
 Anohana: The Flower We Saw That Day
 Chihayafuru
 DokiDoki! PreCure
 Doraemon (2012-2014)
 Dragon Ball
 Dragon Ball GT
 Dragon Ball Super
 Dragon Ball Z
 Fresh Pretty Cure!
 Futari wa Pretty Cure
 Futari wa Pretty Cure Max Heart
 Futari wa Pretty Cure Splash Star
 Go! Princess PreCure
 HappinessCharge PreCure!
 HeartCatch PreCure!
 Hug! Pretty Cure
 Kuroko's Basketball
 Kirakira Pretty Cure a la Mode
 Kiratto Pri Chan
 Idol Time PriPara
 March Comes in Like a Lion
 Naruto
 Naruto Shippuden
 Pokémon
 PriPara
 Rin-ne
 The Rose of Versailles
 Sailor Moon
 Sushi and Beyond
 Smile PreCure!
 Star Twinkle PreCure
 Suite PreCure
 Waccha PriMagi!
 We All Love Sorajiro!
 Witchy PreCure!
 Yes! PreCure 5
 Yes! PreCure 5 GoGo!
 Yowamushi Pedal

Cartoons
 Dexter's Laboratory
 Ed, Edd n Eddy
 Courage the Cowardly Dog
 The Fairly OddParents
 The Grim Adventures of Billy & Mandy
 The Loud House
 The Powerpuff Girls
 SpongeBob SquarePants
 Tom and Jerry
 Winx Club
 Numberblocks
 Alphablocks
 Bluey

Kids
 Kamen Rider Fourze
 Kamen Rider Wizard

References

NHK
Lists of television series by network